Luray is an unincorporated community in Prairie Township, Henry County, Indiana.

History
Luray was laid out and platted in 1836. The community was named after Luray, Virginia since a large share of the early settlers were natives of that state. A post office was established at Luray in 1838, and remained in operation until it was discontinued in 1901.

Geography

References

Unincorporated communities in Henry County, Indiana
Unincorporated communities in Indiana